Csaba Orosz (born August 10, 1971 in Dunajská Streda) is a Slovak sprint canoer of Hungarian ethnicity who competed in the mid-1990s. He won a bronze medal in the C-4 500 m event at the 1994 ICF Canoe Sprint World Championships in Mexico City.

Orosz also competed at the 1996 Summer Olympics in Atlanta, finishing seventh in the C-2 1000 m and eighth in the C-2 500 m events.

References

Sports-reference.com profile

1971 births
Living people
Sportspeople from Dunajská Streda
Hungarians in Slovakia
Canoeists at the 1996 Summer Olympics
Olympic canoeists of Slovakia
Slovak male canoeists
ICF Canoe Sprint World Championships medalists in Canadian